Maysville is the name of several places in the United States of America:
 Maysville, Alabama
 Maysville, Arkansas
 Maysville, Colorado
 Maysville, Georgia
 Maysville, Illinois
 Maysville, Indiana
 Maysville, Iowa
 Maysville, Kentucky
 Maysville, Maine
 Maysville, Missouri
 Maysville, North Carolina
 Maysville, Allen County, Ohio (in Allen and Hardin counties)
 Maysville, Coshocton County, Ohio
 Maysville, Wayne County, Ohio
 Maysville, Oklahoma
 Maysville, Armstrong County, Pennsylvania
 Maysville, Mercer County, Pennsylvania
 Maysville, West Virginia
 Maysville, Virginia, a former name for Buckingham, Virginia

See also
Maysville High School, Ohio
Mayville (disambiguation)
Marysville (disambiguation)
New Maysville, Indiana